Shahrak-e Hejrat may refer to:
 Shahrak-e Hejrat, Kurdistan